Barrow is a civil parish, in the unitary authority of Cheshire West and Chester and the ceremonial county of Cheshire, England. The civil parish contains the village of Great Barrow and the hamlets of Little Barrow, Broomhill and Stamford Bridge.

At the time of the 2001 census the population was 943,  reducing marginally to 941 by the 2011 census.

The name Barrow derives from the Old English bearu (a grove, or small wooded area)

Little Barrow formerly had a station on the Mid-Cheshire line, named Barrow for Tarvin, but it closed in 1953. The former Railway pub at Little Barrow is now the Foxcote tearoom, but Great Barrow retains its pub, the White Horse, which also provides accommodation.  The Stamford Bridge Country Inn is near the A51 road, close to the River Gowy.

Barrow Cricket Club has two Saturday teams and a junior section. The 1st XI play in the Cheshire County Cricket League Division Two, and the 2nd XI plays in the UK Fast League Division B West.

See also

Listed buildings in Barrow, Cheshire
St Bartholomew's Church, Barrow
Barrow Hall

References

External links

 Great Barrow village website
 Great Barrow village hall website

Civil parishes in Cheshire